Virunga may refer to:

 Virunga Mountains, a chain of volcanoes in East Africa
 Virunga National Park, in the eastern Democratic Republic of Congo
 Virunga Foundation, nature conservation body, mainly in the Virunga National Park 
 DC Virunga, a Congolese football club based in Goma
 Stade de Virunga, a multi-use stadium in Goma
 Virunga (film), a 2014 documentary
 Virunga: The Passion of Dian Fossey, Canadian title of the 1987 book Woman in the Mists by Farley Mowat